AFL SuperCoach is an online fantasy football game for the Australian Football League. It was designed by Vapormedia. Herald Sun own the website, and run the competition. They award a prize of $1,000 each week (increased to $2,000 for SuperCoach Plus subscribers) to the entrant with the highest score for that week, as well as a grand prize of $50,000 to the entrant with the highest cumulative point total at the end of the home-and-away season.

Popularity

Point Scoring
Each AFL player scores points for their performance in their game in each round.By using Champion Data's comprehensive rankings system of over 50 different stats, player rankings are the most accurate way to determine how effective a player has been. You can be sure that a high-scoring player is giving his team maximum value. Unlike other stats systems, Champion Data will not simply award a point for each kick, mark or handball. For example, while other games will award points for a kick no matter how far it goes or where it's directed, Champion Data will award zero points for a kick that travels less than 40 meters to a contest.

Team structure and setup 
Teams have a salary cap of $10,000,000, and have a requirement of having exactly 30 players selected.

There are 4 groups of positions:

Defenders - 6 on-field players and 2 on bench.

Midfielders - 8 on-field players and 3 on bench.

Rucks - 2 on-field players and 1 on bench.

Forwards - 6 on-field players and 2 on bench.

Captains and vice captains 
For each round, entrants set a captain, for which their score is doubled. A vice captain is also selected, who gets their score doubled if the player selected as captain does not play.

Emergencies 
Emergencies are used on up to four players on the bench. If a player on the field does not play, the emergency's score for that position (defender, midfielder, ruck or forward) comes on. If there are 2 emergencies in one position, the lowest scoring player comes on for that position (except for players that scored no points).

Substitutions 
You can substitute a player at anytime till lockout. If the player is midfield, the player can only be substituted on from a player on the bench from the midfield. If you have a player listed as midfield and forward, they can be swapped with another player listed as midfield and forward.

Trades 
Each entrant is allocated 35 trades and can perform a maximum of 2 per week (3 in multi-bye rounds). Trades can be reversed till the start of the first match for each round.

Leagues and Groups 
You can join or be part of 10 leagues. When you join, you will automatically be entered in a league. You will compete head-to-head each round. The league will have its own fixture with 4 points for a win, 2 points for a draw and 0 points for a loss. Public leagues are with random people, while private leagues have a join code.

Groups are based on the total number of points and has unlimited people.

Supercoach Plus 
Costing $24.95 annually, it helps by having a team picker before you can register, tells you who's playing each week, optimiser to predict the best possible line up, breakevens, projected scores and players price increases, prediction if players will perform well or poor for the week, access to Supercoach Plus articles and double prizes for the weekly cash winners.

Records 
In Round 7 2006, Jonathan Brown got the highest-ever SuperCoach score—262—against Hawthorn. He got 18 kicks, 7 handballs, 16 marks, 8 goals, 4 behinds, 1 tackle and 1 free kick for. As of August 8, 2022, it remains the record.

References

External links
 Official Herald Sun TAC SuperCoach website

Fantasy sports
Australian Football League